Tang Peng (born 4 February 1981 in Beijing, China) is mainland Chinese-born table tennis player who now represents Hong Kong. He recently married Tie Yana, another Chinese-born table tennis player representing Hong Kong. As of December 2016, he is ranked the number nineteenth player in the world.

Career records
Singles (as of 19 January 2014)
 World Championships: 1/4 finals (2015).
 Pro Tour runner-up (1): 2007 Chile Open.
 Asian Championships: runner-up (2003).

Men's doubles
 World Championships: QF (2009).
 Pro Tour winner (4): 2010 Austrian Open, 2014 Spanish Open, 2014 Australian Open, 2014 Russian Open.
 Pro Tour Grand Finals appearances: 2. Won in 2010.
 Asian Championships: SF (2003).

Mixed doubles
 World Championships: QF (2007).
 Asian Championships: SF (2003).

Team
 Summer Olympic: 4th (2012)
 World Championships: 3rd (2008).
 World Team Cup: 3rd (2009).
 Asian Championships: winner (2003).

References

External links
 
 
 
 
 

Living people
1981 births
Olympic table tennis players of Hong Kong
Table tennis players at the 2012 Summer Olympics
Table tennis players at the 2016 Summer Olympics
Table tennis players at the 2010 Asian Games
Table tennis players at the 2014 Asian Games
Table tennis players from Beijing
Asian Games competitors for Hong Kong
Hong Kong male table tennis players